Yucca filifera is a member of the subfamily Agavaceae, family Asparagaceae, native to central Mexico.

History 

It was discovered in 1840 in northeastern Mexico between Saltillo and Parras on 19 May 1847 by merchant and explorer Josiah Gregg.  It was later introduced to Europe and described for science by J. Benjamin Chabaud (1833-1915) in 1876.

Description 

A tall, heavily branched yucca, Y. filifera has straight, ensiform leaves growing in rosette-shaped bunches from the end of each stem.  Its inflorescence hangs over and is made of many separate white flowers.

Status 
Yucca filifera is not considered to be threatened by the IUCN, as it has a very large range and its population appears to be stable. It is locally used for fibers, and may experience some threat from habitat degradation.

Cultivation 
Y. filifera can be cultivated in xerophytic conditions. It is used as roof covering and as a source of fibre for handcrafting by the indigenous people, who call it palma china or izote.

Am enormous specimen of Yucca filifera stands in front of the Anderson Gallery at the Cantor Arts Center, Stanford University. It was transplanted to  this site in the 1880s. In the spring, it bears long clusters of white flowers, some well over a meter long.

See also

References 

filifera
Flora of Mexico
Plants described in 1876